The 2018 Southern Conference men's soccer tournament, was the 31st edition of the Southern Conference Men's Soccer Tournament. It determined the Southern Conference's automatic berth into the 2018 NCAA Division I Men's Soccer Championship. The tournament began on October 31, 2018 and conclude on November 11, 2018.

The defending champion, Mercer, lost to UNCG 0–1 in the semifinals, who lost to the champions Furman. Furman defeated UNCG 3–0 in the final.

Seeds

Bracket

Results

First round

Quarterfinals

Semifinals

Final

Statistics

Goals

Assists

All Tournament Team

References

External links 
 2018 SoCon Men's Soccer Championship

Southern Conference Men's Soccer Tournament
Southern Conference Men's Soccer
Southern Conference Men's Soccer